Nagod State (also known as 'Nagode' and 'Nagodh') was a princely state of colonial India, located in modern Satna district of Madhya Pradesh. The state was known as 'Unchahara' from the name of Unchehara its original capital until the 18th century.

History
In 1344, the city of Uchchakalpa, present-day Unchahara, was founded by Rajput Raja Veerraj Judeo when he seized the fort of Naro from "the others". In 1720 the state was renamed Nagod after its new capital.
In 1807 Nagod was a tributary to Panna and was included in the sanad granted to that state. In 1809, however, Lal Sheoraj Singh was recognized and confirmed in his territory by a separate sanad granted to him. Nagod State became a British protectorate after the treaty of Bassein in 1820.
Raja Balbhadra Singh was deposed in 1831 for murdering his brother. The state fell into debt and in 1844 the administration was taken over by the British owing to economic mismanagement. The ruler was loyal during the Indian Mutiny in 1857 and was granted the pargana of Dhanwahl. In 1862 the Raja was granted a sanad allowing adoption and in 1865 local rule was reestablished.
Nagod State was a part of Baghelkhand Agency from 1871 till 1931, when it was transferred along with other smaller states back to Bundelkhand Agency. The last Raja of Nagod, HH Shrimant Mahendra Singh, signed the accession of his state to the Indian Union on 1 January 1950.

Rulers
The Nagod Pratihar dynasty ruling family were members were entitled to a hereditary gun salute of 9 guns.

Rajas  
1685 – 1721                Fakir Shah 
1720 – 1748                Chain Singh
1748 – 1780                Ahlad Singh 
1780 – 1818                Lal Sheoraj (Shivraj) Singh        (b. 1777 – d. 1818) 
1818 – 1831                Balbhadra Singh 
1831 – 23 February 1874         Raghubindh (Raghvendra) Singh      (b. 1821 – d. 1874) 
23 Feb 1874 –  4 November 1922  Jadubindh (Jadvendra) Singh        (b. 1855 – d. 1922) 
 4 November 1922 – 26 February 1926  Narharendra Singh                  (b. 1911 – d. 1926) 
26 Feb 1926 – 15 August 1947  Mahendra Singh

See also
Panna State
Political integration of India

References

Princely states of India
Satna district
Rajputs
14th-century establishments in India
1344 establishments in Asia
1950 disestablishments in India